Yarpuz is a village in the central district (Osmaniye) of Osmaniye Province, Turkey. At  it is situated in Nur Mountains and  along Yarpuz creek which is actually a tributary of Ceyhan River. The population of Yarpuz is 572 as of 2011. Although presently only a village, Yarpuz was the capital of Cebelibereket  sanjak during the last years of the Ottoman Empire. (Sanjak was a second level administrative  unit in the Ottoman Empire.)

References

Villages in Osmaniye Province
Osmaniye Central District